Janet Evelyn Fookes, Baroness Fookes  (born 21 February 1936) is a British politician. A member of the Conservative Party, she is a life peer in the House of Lords. She was previously a member of the House of Commons from 1970 to 1997, representing the constituencies of Merton and Morden (1970–74) and Plymouth Drake (1974–97). She was a Deputy Speaker of the House of Commons from 1992 to 1997, and presently is a Deputy Speaker in the House of Lords.

Biography
Fookes was educated at Royal Holloway College, University of London. She worked as a teacher from 1958 to 1970. She served as a Councillor on Hastings Borough Council from 1960 to 1961, and 1963–70.

Fookes was elected a Member of Parliament (MP) representing Merton and Morden in 1970. When this constituency was abolished, she was elected MP for Plymouth Drake in 1974. Drake was never a safe seat, but Fookes managed to survive many strong challenges in each general election she fought, including winning by a majority of just 34 at the October 1974 general election. She served as one of three Deputy Speakers of the House of Commons from 1992 to 1997. She retired from the House of Commons in 1997, after 27 years as an MP: as she humorously put it, "longer than a life sentence".

Fookes served on the Council of the RSPCA 1975–92, and was its chair from 1979 to 1981. She was also a member of the Commonwealth War Graves Commission (1987–97). She is an Ambassador for unemployment charity, Tomorrow's People Trust.

Honours
On 30 September 1997, she was made a Life Peer as Baroness Fookes, of Plymouth in the County of Devon.

She had previously been made a Dame Commander of the Order of the British Empire (DBE) in the 1989 New Year's Honours, and became Deputy Lieutenant of East Sussex in 2001.

Arms

References

 Times Guide to the House of Commons editions 1970–1992

External links 
 

1936 births
Living people
Female members of the Parliament of the United Kingdom for English constituencies
Conservative Party (UK) MPs for English constituencies
Councillors in East Sussex
Dames Commander of the Order of the British Empire
Deputy Lieutenants of East Sussex
Deputy Speakers of the British House of Commons
Life peeresses created by Elizabeth II
Conservative Party (UK) life peers
UK MPs 1970–1974
UK MPs 1974
UK MPs 1974–1979
UK MPs 1979–1983
UK MPs 1983–1987
UK MPs 1987–1992
UK MPs 1992–1997
Alumni of Royal Holloway, University of London
Schoolteachers from London
Members of the Parliament of the United Kingdom for constituencies in Devon
20th-century British women politicians
People from Lewisham
Women councillors in England
Women legislative deputy speakers
Politicians from Plymouth, Devon